The 1977 NCAA Division I Men's Cross Country Championships were the 39th annual cross country meet to determine the team and individual national champions of NCAA Division I men's collegiate cross country running in the United States. Held on  it was hosted by Washington State University at Hangman Valley Golf Course, near Spokane, Washington.

Washington State previously hosted four years earlier in 1973, also at Hangman Valley, south of the city.

All Division I cross country teams were eligible to qualify for the meet through their placement at various regional qualifying meets. In total, 29 teams and 255 individual runners contested this championship.

The team national championship was won by the Oregon Ducks, their fourth title. The individual championship was retained by Henry Rono, from Washington State, with a time of 28:33.50. This was Rono's second individual title; he would go on to win again in 1979.

Men's title
Distance:

Team Result (Top 10)

Individual Result (Top 10)

See also
NCAA Men's Division II Cross Country Championship 
NCAA Men's Division III Cross Country Championship

References
 

NCAA Cross Country Championships
NCAA Division I Cross Country Championships
NCAA Division I Cross Country Championships
NCAA Division I Cross Country Championships
Sports competitions in Spokane, Washington
Track and field in Washington (state)
Washington State University